The Muya is a left tributary of the Vitim in Buryatia, Russia.

The area through which the river flows is sparsely populated, the only settlement on the river being Taksimo, with the small village of Ust-Muya located where the river flows into the Vitim.

The Muya has lent its name to a number of other geographic features, including the Northern Muya Range, the Southern Muya Range, as well as the local Muya District.

See also
List of rivers of Russia

References

Rivers of Buryatia
Stanovoy Highlands